Wilmington and Brandywine Cemetery is a rural cemetery at 701 Delaware Avenue in Wilmington, Delaware. Founded in 1843, it contains over 21,000 burials on about 25 acres.

History

The cemetery was envisioned in 1843 by Sam Wollaston, who sought to establish one of Delaware's first non-sectarian cemeteries on 10 acres of his farm, which was outside the city of Wilmington at the time.  His venture was quickly a success, and the following year, Wollaston formed a company to expand and landscape the site with Willard Hall serving as president. Engineer George Read Riddle was hired to design the cemetery.  In 1850, James Canby planted an imported cedar of Lebanon at the entrance of the cemetery.

One corner of the cemetery, named Soldier's Graveplot, contains the remains of 121 U.S. Civil War soldiers who died from their wounds or war-related illnesses at the old Delaware Hospital.

The cemetery's chapel, designed by architect Elijah Dallett Jr., was built in 1913 of Foxcroft stone with window sills of Indiana limestone.

In 1917, the cemetery received remains originally interred at the 18th-century First Presbyterian Church in Wilmington's Rodney Square. The church was moved to Park Drive to make room for a new library.

In 2014, the cemetery launched the Eternal Rest 5K Walk/Run to raise money to maintain the cemetery.

Notable burials

 William Hepburn Armstrong (1824–1919), U.S. Congressman
 Richard Bassett (1745–1815), U.S. Senator and Governor of Delaware, signer of the United States Constitution
 James Asheton Bayard Sr. (1767–1815), U.S. Senator and Congressman
 Richard H. Bayard (1796–1868), U.S. Senator
 Gunning Bedford Jr. (1747–1812), Signer of the U.S. Constitution
 Emily Bissell (1861–1948), Social reformer, introduced Christmas Seals to the United States
 Levi Clark Bootes (1809–1896), Civil War Brevet Brigadier General
 James Canby (1781–1858), early American railroad executive
 John P. Gillis (1803–1873), Commodore in the U.S. Navy
 Willard Hall (1780–1875), U.S. Congressman
 Bill Hawke (1870–1902), Major League Baseball pitcher
 William H. Heald (1864–1939), U.S. Congressman
 Jacob Jones (1768–1850), U.S. Naval Officer
 Flip Lafferty (1854–1910), professional baseball player
 Henry Latimer (1752–1819), U.S. Senator and Congressman
 Preston Lea (1841–1916), 52nd Governor of Delaware
 Eleazer McComb (1740–1798), Continental Congressman
 John McKinly (1721–1796), President of Delaware
 Charles R. Miller (1857–1927), 54th Governor of Delaware
 John J. Milligan (1795–1875), U.S. Congressman
 Alice Dunbar Nelson (1875–1935), poet, journalist and political activist
 Hezekiah Niles (1777–1839), editor and poet of the Weekly Register
 James P. Postles (1840–1908), American Medal of Honor recipient
 George R. Riddle (1817–1867), U.S. Senator and Congressman
 Robert P. Robinson (1869–1939), 57th Governor of Delaware
 John Ross (1790–1866), Cherokee nation chief
 Thomas Alfred Smyth (1832–1865), brigadier general in the Union Army
 James Tilton (1745–1822), Continental Congressman
 John Wales (1783–1863), U.S. Senator
 Henry Winfield Watson (1856–1933), U.S. Congressman

References

External links
 Official website
 

1843 establishments in Delaware
Buildings and structures in Wilmington, Delaware
Cemeteries established in the 1840s
Cemeteries in Delaware
Rural cemeteries